Gergő Rácz (born 20 November 1995) is a Hungarian football player who plays for MTK Budapest on loan from Paks.

Club statistics

Updated to games played as of 15 May 2021.

External links
 
 

1995 births
Footballers from Budapest
Living people
Hungarian footballers
Association football goalkeepers
Ferencvárosi TC footballers
Soroksári TE footballers
Paksi FC players
MTK Budapest FC players
Nemzeti Bajnokság I players
Nemzeti Bajnokság II players